Mickleover railway station is a disused railway station which served the village of Mickleover, Derbyshire, England (now part of the city of Derby). It was opened by the Great Northern Railway on its Derbyshire Extension in 1878.

History 

From , the line climbed at 1 in 100 for two miles southwards. On the outskirts shortly after the present Derby ring road, the line entered a deep cutting leading to Mickleover Tunnel. The summit of the climb lay at the other end and, being curved so it is Hhtps1287537a particular challenge to train drivers.

The station was about a mile north of the village along Station Road. It was labelled Mickleover for Radbourne, since it was in that parish, albeit some two miles distant. Originally it was spelt "Radburn" and, for a while, "Radbourn".

It was provided with substantial brick buildings; a two-storey station master's house and single storey offices on the platforms. Regular passenger traffic finished in 1939, although it saw excursions until 1959. The station was completely closed in 1964 when goods traffic ceased.

The line from Friargate remained open for some years, and was used as a test track by the British Rail Research Division.

Present day 

The main station building has been converted into two private dwellings.

References

Disused railway stations in Derby
Railway stations in Great Britain opened in 1878
Railway stations in Great Britain closed in 1939
Former Great Northern Railway stations